Eugene Walter Baker (June 15, 1925 – December 1, 1999) was an American Major League Baseball infielder who played for the Chicago Cubs and Pittsburgh Pirates during eight seasons between 1953 and 1961, and was selected for the National League team in the 1955 All-Star Game.

Early life, navy and Negro leagues 

A native of Davenport, Iowa, Baker starred on the basketball and track teams at Davenport High School, and played sandlot baseball, then went into the United States Navy, being stationed at Ottumwa Naval Air Station and Iowa Pre-Flight School. After his discharge from the Navy, he played for the Kansas City Monarchs of the Negro American League as their regular shortstop during 1948 and 1949.

Minor leagues 

In 1950, Baker joined the Cubs' organization, playing briefly at Springfield and Des Moines before joining the Los Angeles Angels, of the Triple-A and Open Classification Pacific Coast League, where he impressed all with his fielding and baserunning. Bobby Bragan, manager of the Angels’ chief rivals, the Hollywood Stars, said Baker was "as good a shortstop as I’ve ever seen – and that includes Pee Wee Reese."

Major leagues 

The Cubs purchased Gene Baker's contract and he made his major league debut September 20, 1953. A few days after acquiring Baker, the Cubs acquired another shortstop, future Hall of Famer Ernie Banks, and moved Baker to second base, perhaps believing he would be able to adapt to a different position more easily than the younger Banks. He primarily played second base for the Cubs and Pirates during eight seasons. He was a reserve infielder for the 1960 World Series champion Pirates and made three pinch-hit appearances during the Series.

Post-playing career 

In 1961, Baker became the first African-American manager in Organized Baseball when the Pirates named him skipper of their Batavia Pirates farm club in the New York–Penn League.  In 1962, he became the first black coach in Organized Baseball when the Pirates named him player-coach of their Triple-A International League affiliate Columbus Jets.  In 1963, the Pirates promoted him to coach on the Major League team.  He was the second black coach in the big leagues, following Buck O'Neil by a half-season. He is also credited with being the first black manager in Major League Baseball when he took over for ejected Pirates manager Danny Murtaugh on September 21, 1963.  Baker then spent many years as a scout for the Pirates.

Death 

He died in Davenport at the age of 74. He is buried in Rock island National Cemetery.

See also
 List of Negro league baseball players who played in Major League Baseball

References

External links

1925 births
1999 deaths
African-American baseball coaches
African-American baseball managers
African-American baseball players
Baseball players from Iowa
Batavia Pirates players
Chicago Cubs players
Columbus Jets players
Des Moines Bruins players
Kansas City Monarchs players
Los Angeles Angels (minor league) players
Major League Baseball second basemen
Minor league baseball managers
Pittsburgh Pirates coaches
Pittsburgh Pirates players
Pittsburgh Pirates scouts
Sportspeople from Davenport, Iowa
Springfield Cubs (Massachusetts) players
African Americans in World War II
United States Navy personnel of World War II